Fallback is a contingency option to be taken if the preferred choice is unavailable. It may specifically refer to:
 A signal of inferior quality in HD Radio
 Fallback font in graphic user interface and typesetting
 Fallback voting
 A feature of a modem protocol; see fall back and forward
 Happy Eyeballs (also called Fast Fallback), an IP networking technique

Other 
 Fallback or Outback (Transformers), a fictional character
 "Fall Back", a single from Dear Jayne R&B/pop trio